Events in the year 2019 in Hong Kong.

Incumbents

Executive branch 
 Chief Executive: Carrie Lam
 Chief Secretary for Administration: Matthew Cheung
 Financial Secretary: Paul Mo-po Chan
 Secretary for Justice: Teresa Cheng

Legislative branch 
 President of the Legislative Council: Andrew Leung

Judicial branch 
 Chief Justice of the Court of Final Appeal: Geoffrey Ma

Events
 29 March – the Government gazettes the extradition bill.
 9 April – Nine defendants, including Benny Tai, were convicted for occupying Central in 2014.
 mid-April – Scandal between Andy Hui and Jacqueline Wong broke
 17 June – Joshua Wong released from prison.
 1 July – Protesters stormed LegCo.
 21 July – After the Yuen Long attack, no arrest were made by the police upon investigation at a nearby village that night.
 15 August – Benny Tai released on bail.
 22 August – Protests enter their 12th week as police reintroduced water-cannons and tear gas.
 31 August – The raptors stormed Prince Edward station, the police arrested 65 people.
 22 September – Chan Yin-lam's cadaver, floating in the sea, was recovered by Marine Police.
 5 October – The Prohibition on Face Covering Regulation begins.
 10 October – Chan Yin-lam cremated.
 23 October – Chan Tong-kai released from prison.
 4 November - Chow Tsz-lok, who fell from height, died.
 11 November – The conflict at Chinese University begins.
 24 November – In the 2019 Hong Kong local elections, The pro-democracy camp achieved its biggest landslide victory in the history of Hong Kong, gaining control of 17 of the 18 District Councils and tripling their seats from around 124 to about 388.
 27 November – United States signs Hong Kong Human Rights and Democracy Act that requires the U.S. government to impose sanctions against Chinese and Hong Kong officials.
 29 November – As the siege of the Hong Kong Polytechnic University ends, the University takes back the control of the campus.

Deaths
3 January – Michael Yeung, Roman Catholic prelate, Bishop of the Roman Catholic Diocese of Hong Kong (b. 1945).

12 January – Patrick Yu, barrister, Hong Kong's first Chinese prosecutor (b. 1922).

11 March – Peter Wong Man-kong, shipping magnate and politician (b. 1949).

See also
 List of Hong Kong films of 2019

References

 
Years of the 21st century in Hong Kong
Hong Kong
Hong Kong